Koji Inada may refer to:
, Japanese footballer
, Japanese manga artist